The C. G. Howes Dry Cleaning—Carley Real Estate building is a historic commercial building at 1171 Washington Street in the West Newton village of Newton, Massachusetts.  The single story buff brick building was constructed in 1928, to a design by Boston architect William Drummey, to house the dry cleaning and fur storage business of C. G. Howes.  In 1937 the building was purchased by Doris Carley, founder of the Carley Realty Company, the first female-owned realty business in the city.  Ms. Carley was also one of the founders of the regional multiple listing service, and was active in the real estate business for fifty years.

The building was listed on the National Register of Historic Places in 1990.  It is listed on the register at 1173 Washington Street.

As of early 2020, the building was demolished.

See also
 National Register of Historic Places listings in Newton, Massachusetts

References

National Register of Historic Places in Newton, Massachusetts
Commercial buildings on the National Register of Historic Places in Massachusetts
Commercial buildings completed in 1928
Buildings and structures in Newton, Massachusetts
1928 establishments in Massachusetts